Cuspivolva celzardi is a species of sea snail, a marine gastropod mollusc in the family Ovulidae, the ovulids, cowry allies or false cowries.

Description
The length of the shell attains 12 mm.

Distribution
This species occurs in the East China Sea.

References

 Fehse, 2008. Contributions to the knowledge of the Ovulidae (Mollusca: Gastropoda) XXI. A new species in the genus Primovula. Visaya 2(3): 64–67
 Lorenz F. & Fehse D. (2009) The living Ovulidae. A manual of the families of allied cowries: Ovulidae, Pediculariidae and Eocypraeidae. Hackenheim: Conchbooks

External links

Ovulidae
Gastropods described in 2008